Homoeonema platygonon is a species of deep sea hydrozoan of the family Halicreatidae. It is the only species in the monotypic genus Homoeonema.

References

Halicreatidae
Animals described in 1893
Monotypic cnidarian genera
Hydrozoan genera